Symmetrischema is a genus of moths in the family Gelechiidae.

Species

 Symmetrischema alternatum Povolný, 1990
 Symmetrischema alticolum (Povolný, 1990)
 Symmetrischema altisona (Meyrick, 1917)
 Symmetrischema andinum Povolný, 1990
 Symmetrischema anthracinum Povolný, 1990
 Symmetrischema anthracoides Povolný, 1990
 Symmetrischema arctanderi Povolný, 1990
 Symmetrischema ardeola (Meyrick, 1931)
 Symmetrischema assimile Povolný, 1990
 Symmetrischema atrifascis (Meyrick, 1917)
 Symmetrischema borsaniella (Köhler, 1939)
 Symmetrischema capsica (Bradley & Povolný, 1965)
 Symmetrischema capsicivorum Povolný, 1973
 Symmetrischema cestrivora (Clarke, 1950)
 Symmetrischema conifera (Meyrick, 1916)
 Symmetrischema costaricanum Povolný, 1990
 Symmetrischema disciferum Povolný, 1989
 Symmetrischema draculinum Povolný, 1989
 Symmetrischema dulce Povolný, 1984
 Symmetrischema elementare Povolný, 1989
 Symmetrischema escondidella Landry, 2010
 Symmetrischema femininum Povolný, 1989
 Symmetrischema fercularia (Meyrick, 1929)
 Symmetrischema funebrale Povolný, 1990
 Symmetrischema grandispinum Povolný, 1990
 Symmetrischema inexpectatum Povolný, 1967
 Symmetrischema inkorum Povolný, 1990
 Symmetrischema insertum Povolný, 1988
 Symmetrischema kendallorum Blanchard & Knudson, 1982
 Symmetrischema krabbei Povolný, 1990
 Symmetrischema lavernella (Chambers, 1874)
 Symmetrischema lectulifera (Meyrick, 1929)
 Symmetrischema loquax (Meyrick, 1917)
 Symmetrischema major Povolný, 1990
 Symmetrischema nanum Povolný, 1989
 Symmetrischema nummulatum Povolný, 1989
 Symmetrischema oblitum Povolný, 1989
 Symmetrischema pallidochrella (Chambers, 1872)
 Symmetrischema peruanum Povolný, 1990
 Symmetrischema piperinum Povolný, 1989
 Symmetrischema primigenium Povolný, 1989
 Symmetrischema pulchrum Povolný, 1989
 Symmetrischema purum Povolný, 1990
 Symmetrischema respectabile Povolný, 1989
 Symmetrischema senex Povolný, 1990
 Symmetrischema solitare Povolný, 1989
 Symmetrischema solum Povolný, 1989
 Symmetrischema striatella (Murtfeldt, 1900)
 Symmetrischema symmetricum Povolný, 1990
 Symmetrischema tangolias (Gyen, 1913)
 Symmetrischema ventralella (Zeller, 1877)

Status unclear
 Symmetrischema solani (Berg), described as Gelechia solani from South America

References

External links

 
Gnorimoschemini